Waterford Barracks was a military installation in Waterford, Ireland.

History

There were two sets of barracks in Waterford: the infantry barracks on the North side of Barrack Street and the artillery barracks on the South side. It is not known when the infantry barracks were established but it is accepted that the artillery barracks were built in the aftermath of the Irish Rebellion and completed at the end of the 18th century. During the First World War the artillery barracks, at that time known as the cavalry barracks, served as the 1st cavalry depot providing accommodation for the 5th Royal Irish Lancers, the 9th Queen's Royal Lancers, the 12th Royal Lancers, the 16th The Queen's Lancers, the 17th Lancers and the 21st Lancers.

During the Irish Civil War the barracks were seized by the anti-treaty forces; however in the ensuing battle there were many direct hits from gunfire. By the end of the Irish Civil War the infantry barracks were in a very dilapidated state and the artillery barracks had been largely destroyed when a direct hit exploded in the magazine. The artillery barracks were gone by the 1930s and were replaced by St. Carthage's Avenue.

References

Barracks in the Republic of Ireland